The Witch's Children and the Queen is a children's picture book written by Ursula Jones, illustrated by Russell Ayto, and published by Orchard Children's Books in 2003. It won the Nestlé Smarties Book Prize, ages category 0–5 years.

Series

This is the second of three Witch's Children books created by Jones, perhaps better known as an actress, and Ayto. Ayto made the Greenaway Medal longlist as illustrator of the first one, The Witch's Children (Orchard, 2001). As of July 2013, it alone has a U.S. edition catalogued by the Library of Congress. There are editions in several other languages.

The Witch's Children Go to School (Orchard, November 2008) won the inaugural Roald Dahl Funny Prize, ages six and under.

References

Children's fiction books
2003 children's books
British picture books
British children's books
Orchard Books books